An air shower is an extensive (many kilometres wide) cascade of ionized particles and electromagnetic radiation produced in the atmosphere when a primary cosmic ray (i.e. one of extraterrestrial origin) enters the atmosphere. When a particle, which could be a proton, a nucleus, an electron, a photon, or (rarely) a positron, strikes an atom's nucleus in the air it produces many energetic hadrons. The unstable hadrons decay in the air speedily into other particles and electromagnetic radiation, which are part of the particle shower components. The secondary radiation rains down, including x-rays, muons, protons, antiprotons, alpha particles, pions, electrons, positrons, and neutrons.

The dose from cosmic radiation is largely from muons, neutrons, and electrons, with a dose rate that varies in different parts of the world and based largely on the geomagnetic field, altitude, and solar cycle. Airline crews receive more cosmic rays if they routinely work flight routes that take them close to the North or South pole at high altitudes, where this type of radiation is maximal.

The air shower was discovered by Bruno Rossi in 1934. In 1937 Pierre Auger, unaware of Rossi's earlier report, detected the same phenomenon and investigated it in some detail. He concluded that high-energy primary cosmic-ray particles interact with air nuclei high in the atmosphere, initiating a cascade of secondary interactions that ultimately yield a shower of electrons, and photons that reach ground level. By observing the cosmic ray with the detectors placed apart from each other, Rossi recognized that many particles arrive simultaneously at the detectors.  This phenomenon is now called an air shower.

Air shower formation

After the primary cosmic particle has collided with the air molecule, the main part of the first interactions are pions. Also kaons and baryons may be created. Pions, kaons, and heavy baryons are unstable, and decay into lighter and more stable particles relatively high in the atmosphere.

Neutral pions  decay by the electroweak interaction into pairs of oppositely spinning photons  in the process  The photons produced form an electromagnetic cascade by creating more photons, protons, antiprotons, electrons, and positrons.

Charged pions  preferentially decay into muons and (anti)neutrinos via the weak interaction  and  This is how the muons and neutrinos that eventually reach the ground are produced in the air shower.

The same holds true for kaons which can produce muons in the process  and  In addition, kaons can produce also pions via the decay mode

Detection
The original particle arrives with high energy and hence a velocity near the speed of light, so the products of the collisions tend also to move generally in the same direction as the primary, while to some extent spreading sidewise. In addition, the secondary particles produce a widespread flash of light in forward direction due to the Cherenkov effect, as well as fluorescence light that is emitted isotropically from the excitation of nitrogen molecules. The particle cascade and the light produced in the atmosphere can be detected with surface detector arrays and optical telescopes. Surface detectors typically use Cherenkov detectors or Scintillation counters to detect the charged secondary particles at ground level. The telescopes used to measure the fluorescence and Cherenkov light use large mirrors to focus the light on PMT clusters. Finally, air showers emit radio waves due to the deflection of electrons and positrons by the geomagnetic field. As advantage over the optical techniques, radio detection is possible around the clock and not only during dark and clear nights. Thus, several modern experiments, e.g., TAIGA, LOFAR, or the Pierre Auger Observatory use radio antennas in addition to particle detectors and optical techniques.

The longitudinal profile of the number of charged particles can be parameterized by the Gaisser–Hillas function.

See also
Cosmic-ray observatory

References

External links
Extensive Air Showers.
 Buckland Park Air Shower Detector
Haverah Park Detection System
HiRes Detector System
Pierre Auger Observatory
HiSPARC (High School Project on Astrophysics Research with Cosmics)
AIRES (AIRshower Extended Simulations) : Large and well documented Fortran package for simulating cosmic ray showers by Sergio Sciutto at the Department of Physics of the Universidad Nacional de La Plata, Argentina
CORSIKA, CORSIKA: Another code for simulating cosmic ray air showers by Dieter Heck of the Forschungszentrum Karlsruhe, Germany
COSMUS : Interactive animated 3d models of several different cosmic ray air showers, and instructions on how to make your own using AIRES simulations. From the COSMUS group at the University of Chicago.
Milagro Animations : Movies and instructions for how to make them, showing how air showers interact with the Milagro detector. By Miguel Morales.
CASSIM Animations : Animations of different cosmic ray air showers by Hajo Dreschler of New York University.
SPASE2 Experiment : South-Pole Air Shower Experiment (SPASE).
GAMMA Experiment : High mountain Air Shower Experiment.

Atmosphere
Earth phenomena
Cosmic rays